Orangeville District Secondary School is located at 22 Faulkner Street in Orangeville, Ontario, Canada, and is the oldest secondary school in the town.  It was built in its current state after the old high school (originally built in 1884) burned down in 1948.  Currently, grades 9 through 12 are housed at O.D.S.S. There are 1,350 students that attend this school. The principal is Patrick Hamilton and the vice principal is Steve Wynen. 

Famous graduates include WWE stars Adam Copeland and Jason Reso, better known as Edge and Christian, Alex and Chris van den Hoef of DVBBS, NBA player Ignas Brazdeikis and Degrassi: The Next Generation actor Ryan Cooley. ODSS also provides the academic instruction for the Athlete Institute, an elite basketball prep school, which has recently featured 2016 NBA Draft first-round picks Jamal Murray and Thon Maker, with Maker coming directly out of high school.  Film director Richard Boddington graduated from ODSS in 1986.

See also
List of high schools in Ontario

References

External links
Orangeville District Secondary School

Orangeville, Ontario
High schools in Dufferin County
1884 establishments in Ontario
Educational institutions established in 1884